Helio Vera was a Paraguayan writer, lawyer and journalist. He was columnist of the ABC Color Journal of Asunción and published many stories and novels in his entire career.

His life 

Helio Vera worked as a reporter in the first years of ABC Color and after working on other media he reincorporated as columnist and editorialist. His first attempt in the literary world was in the 1980s with essays and criticism and hilarious stories about the Paraguayan culture. He earned a well-disserved prestige by his talent and his distinctive style. In his work he used a direct language and was distinguished with many awards as the "El Lector" Prize to the best literary work in 1984 for "Angola y otros Cuentos" (Angola and other stories); the first place in the 5th Centenary Essay Contest in 1988 organized by the Ibero-American Cooperation Institute and the Embassy of Spain, for the Essay "Teoría y Práctica de la Paraguayología" (Theory and Practice of the Paraguayanology); and the first prize in the "Néstor Romero Valdovinos" Story Contest in 1992.

He was an active member of the Revolutionary Febrerista Party, full member of the International Socialist, even his grave had the flag of his party on top. His picture also is in the gallery of illustrate Februarists in the Martyrs of the Februarism Hall.

Work

Awards 

 "El Lector" Prize to the best literary work in 1984, for Angola y otros Cuentos (Angola and other stories).
 First Prize. 5th Centenary Essay Contest in 1988, organized by the Ibero-American Cooperation Institute and the Embacy of Spain, for the essay Teoría y Práctica de la Paraguayología (Theory and Practice of the Paraguayanology).
 First Prize. "Néstor Romero Valdovinos" Story Contest in 1992, for the story Destinadas (Destined).
 Second Prize. International Story Contest in 1995, organized by the Pension Bank of Salamanca, Spain, for La Paciencia de Celestino Leiva (The Patience of Celestino Leiva).
 Special mention of the National Literature Award of Paraguay in 1999, for Antiplomo. Manual de Lucha contra los Pesados (Antiplumber. Manual of fighting against heavy people).
 Special mention of the National Literature Award of Paraguay in 2005, for La Paciencia de Celestino Leiva (The Patience of Celestino Leiva)
 Municipal Literature Prize in 2006, for the book La Paciencia de Celestino Leiva (The Patience of Celestino Leiva)

Last days

He died on March 25, 2008 in the Santa Clara Clinic of Asunción where he was interned after being operated for a cerebral emboli that he suffered that month. His situation complicated because of an arritmia, the diabetes and arterial hypertension.

References

External links
Sitio web personal de Helio Vera
Tributo de ABC color a Helio Vera

1946 births
2008 deaths
People from Villarrica, Paraguay
Revolutionary Febrerista Party politicians
Paraguayan journalists
Male journalists
Paraguayan short story writers
Paraguayan male writers
Male short story writers
Universidad Nacional de Asunción alumni
20th-century journalists